A tour guide (U.S.) or a tourist guide (European) is a person who provides assistance, information on cultural, historical and contemporary heritage to people on organized sightseeing and individual clients at educational establishments, religious and historical sites such as; museums, and at various venues of tourist attraction resorts. Tour guides also take clients on outdoor guided trips. These trips include hiking, whitewater rafting, mountaineering, alpine climbing, rock climbing, ski and snowboarding in the backcountry, fishing, and biking.

History

In 18th-century Japan, a traveler could pay for a tour guide or consult guide books such as Kaibara Ekken's Keijō Shōran (The Excellent Views of Kyoto).

Description

In Europe 
The CEN (European Committee for Standardization) definition for "tourist guide" – part of the work by CEN on definitions for terminology within the tourism industry – is a "person who guides visitors in the language of their choice and interprets the cultural and natural heritage of an area, which person normally possesses an area-specific qualification usually issued and/or recognized by the appropriate authority". CEN also defines a "tour manager" as a "person who manages and supervises the itinerary on behalf of the tour operator, ensuring the programme is carried out as described in the tour operator's literature and sold to the traveller/consumer and who gives local practical information".

In Europe, tourist guides are represented by FEG, the European Federation of Tourist Guide Associations.  In Europe, the tourist guiding qualification is specific to each country; in some cases the qualification is national, in some cases it is broken up into regions. In all cases it is embedded in the educational and training ethic of that country. EN15565 is a European Standard for the Training and Qualification of Tourist Guides.

In Australia 
In Australia, tour guides are qualified to a minimum of Certificate III Guiding.]. They belong to a couple of organisations, notably the Professional Tour Guide Association of Australia [PTGAA] and Guides of Australia [GOA]. 

According to the Tour Guides Australia Code of Conduct, guides must commit to:

 Provid[ing] a professional service to visitors – ensuring they are treated with respect, care and a commitment to best practice guiding. 
 Providing objective and fair interpretations of the places visited.
 Educat[ing] visitors on the need to be respectful of our precious natural, cultural and heritage environments, minimising our footprint and always impacts.
 Act in such a way as to bring credit to the country and to the promotion of it as a tourist destination.
 Regularly updat[ing their] guiding skills and knowledge through training, professional development, and networking activities.
 Continually maintain a valid Certificate II in First Aid & CPR
 Have their own indemnity insurance (if self employed)

In Japan 
In Japan, tour guides are required to pass a certification exam by the Commissioner of the Japan Tourism Agency and register with the relevant prefectures. Non-licensed guides caught performing guide-interpreter activities can face a fine up to 500,000 Yen

In India 
In India it is mandatory to have a license approved by the Ministry of Tourism (India) to work officially as a tourist guide. The government provides the license to regional level tour guide and also runs a Regional Level Guide Training Program (RLGTP). These programs and training sessions are conducted under the guidance of Indian Institute of Tourism and Travel Management (IITTM) or other government recognized institutes.

In South Africa

In South Africa tourist guides are required to register in terms of the Tourism Act 3, 2014. Training must be done through a trainer accredited by the Culture, Arts, Tourism, Hospitality and Sport Sector Education and Training Authority.

See also 

 Audio tour
 Blue Badge tourist guide
 Cell phone tour
 Cicerone
 Free Walking Tour
 GPS tour
 Institute of Tourist Guiding
 Museum docent
 Museum education
 Seasonworker

References

Further reading 
 MacCannell, Dean. The Ethics of Sightseeing. University of California Press, 2011.
 Pond, Kathleen Lingle. The Professional Guide: Dynamics of Tour Guiding. New York: Van Nostrand Reinhold, 1993.
 Ruitenberg, Claudia W. "Learning by Walking: Non-Formal Education as Curatorial Practice and Intervention in Public Space." International Journal of Lifelong Education 31, no. 3 (2012): 261–275.
 Salazar, Noel B. (2005). Tourism and glocalization: 'Local' tour guiding. Annals of Tourism Research, 32(3), 628–646. 
 Salazar, Noel B. (2006). Touristifying Tanzania: Local guides, global discourse. Annals of Tourism Research, 33(3), 833–852.
 Salazar, Noel B. (2008). "Enough stories!” Asian tourism redefining the roles of Asian tour guides. Civilisations, 57(1/2), 207–222. 
 Salazar, Noel B. (2010). Envisioning Eden: Mobilizing imaginaries in tourism and beyond. Oxford: Berghahn. 
 Wynn, Jonathan R. The Tour Guide: Walking and Talking New York. Chicago: The University of Chicago Press, 2011.
 Wynn, Jonathan R. "City Tour Guides: Urban Alchemists at Work." City & Community 9, no. 2 (June 2010).

External links 

 World Federation of Tourist Guide Associations
 European Federation of Tourist Guide Associations

Personal care and service occupations
Hospitality occupations
Museum education